Auguste II Marie Henri van de Werve (1764–1793), baron of Lichtaert, formed part of a very old, important and noble family of Antwerp.

Family 
He was the only child of Charles IV Bernard van de Werve, 2nd Count of Vosselaer and countess née Hubertine de Gilman. When his father inherited the title of count of Vorsselaer, Augustin became baron of Lichtaert as wire elder of the count of Vorsselaer. But he died before his father, and never became count of Vorsselaer.

Descendants 
In 1784 he married Marie-Anne van Colen, daughter of Charles-Joseph van Colen

 Maria Theresia Joanne Josepha van de Werve, (1785-1854): Married Louis Nicolas de Haultepenne.
 Reine Anne Marie Josepha van de Werve, (1789-1864)  married Charles della Faille, (1784-1849)
 Charles V Augustin van de Werve, Count of Vosselaer, (1786-1862)
 Philip Louis Ignace Josephe Marie van de Werve, BAron of Schilde: Married  1st Marie de Fraula, 2nd Therese Peeters, 3rd Marie Louise della Faille.
 Jacques Joseph Marie de Paule van de Werve, married Charlotte de Cosse.
 Louis Paul François van de Werve, Count of Vorsselaer, (1791-1850), married Jeanne Gillès de Pelichy.
 Cajetan Louis Maria Joseph van de Werve, married Florence Ullens de Schoten.
 Philippe Marie Joseph Herman van de Werve, married Léocadie Geelhand (1817-1866).
 René-Philippe van de Werve, (1850–1911): married Louise Bosschaert (1855-1888).
  Léon van de Werve (1851-1920): married Irène Kervyn d'Oud Mooreghem (1857-1938).
 Fernand van de Werve, (1876-1958): married Blanche de Lichtervelde.

References

1764 births
1793 deaths
Augustin
Barons of Lichtaart
Barons of Rielen